is a Japanese hotel chain established in 1973 by All Nippon Airways (ANA). In October 2006, ANA sold majority ownership of ANA Hotels to the InterContinental Hotels Group (IHG), which is now the primary shareholder. The managed properties of ANA Hotels are marketed under the ANA InterContinental, ANA Crowne Plaza, ANA Hotels and ANA Holiday Inn brands.

History
ANA Hotels has been a hotel management company since its establishment in 1973 as a subsidiary of All Nippon Airways Co. Ltd.

On 23 October 2006, the sale of ANA Hotels to InterContinental Hotels Group (IHG) resulted in ANA Hotels becoming mainly owned by IHG, which holds 74% shares in the company, while All Nippon Airways retains 25%; with 1% held by other investors.

On 30 November 2006, ANA Hotels Company Ltd. was renamed to "IHG ANA Hotels Group Japan LLC." to further establish its business description as a hotel operator.

On 13 April 2007, All Nippon Airways sold its 13 domestic hotels to Morgan Stanley for about 280 billion yen. Following its acquisition, the operating rights of each hotel acquired by Morgan Stanley will be unified into "Panorama Hotels One" which was newly established by Panorama Hospitality, a subsidiary company of Morgan Stanley. After that, however, it was split into three companies: Panorama Hotels One Inc., Horizon Hotels One Inc., and Central Hotels Inc. These facilities were gradually withdrawn from capital by sale. In July 2015, Horizon Hotels was sold to Hoshino Resorts, and the transfer to other operating companies was completed.

Brands
Operating under the "IHG ANA Group Hotels", ANA Hotels has managed 33 properties in Japan, with a total inventory of 10,000 guest rooms, 8 InterContinental or ANA InterContinental branded hotels, 19 ANA Crowne Plaza branded hotels and 6 ANA Holiday Inn branded hotels. Since 2007, its acquisition by InterContinental Hotels Group has increased the total guest rooms networked.

Group hotels

Japan

Hokkaidō
ANA Crowne Plaza Sapporo (Sapporo)
ANA Holiday Inn Sapporo Susukino (Sapporo)
ANA Crowne Plaza Hotel Chitose (Chitose) 
ANA Crowne Plaza Hotel Kushiro (Kushiro)  
Tōhoku
Miyagi Prefecture
ANA Holiday Inn Sendai (Sendai)
Kantō
Chiba Prefecture
 ANA Crowne Plaza Hotel Narita (Narita)
Tokyo
 ANA Intercontinental Tokyo (Minato) 
 Strings Hotel Tokyo Intercontinental (Shinagawa)
Chūbu
Aichi Prefecture
 ANA Crowne Plaza Hotel Grand Court Nagoya (Nagoya)
Ishikawa Prefecture
 ANA Crowne Plaza Hotel Kanazawa (Kanazawa)
 ANA Holiday Inn Kanazawa Sky (Kanazawa)
Niigata Prefecture
 ANA Crowne Plaza Hotel Niigata (Niigata)
Toyama Prefecture
 ANA Crowne Plaza Hotel Toyama (Toyama)
Kansai
 Hyōgo Prefecture
 ANA Crowne Plaza Hotel Kobe (Kobe)
 Kyoto Prefecture
 ANA Crowne Plaza Hotel Kyoto (Kyoto)
 Osaka Prefecture
 ANA Crowne Plaza Osaka (Osaka)
 Holiday Inn Osaka Namba (Osaka)
Chūgoku
 Hiroshima Prefecture
 ANA Crowne Plaza Hiroshima (Hiroshima)
 Okayama Prefecture
 ANA Crowne Plaza Hotel Okayama (Okayama)
 Tottori Prefecture
 ANA Crowne Plaza Yonago (Yonago)
 Yamaguchi Prefecture
 ANA Crowne Plaza Ube (Ube)
Shikoku
 Ehime Prefecture
 ANA Crowne Plaza Hotel Matsuyama (Matsuyama)
Kyūshū
 Fukuoka Prefecture
 ANA Crowne Plaza Fukuoka (Fukuoka)
 Kumamoto Prefecture
 ANA Crowne Plaza Hotel Kumamoto New Sky (Kumamoto)
 Nagasaki Prefecture
 ANA Crowne Plaza Hotel Nagasaki Gloverhill (Nagasaki)
 Miyazaki Prefecture
 ANA Holiday Inn Resort Miyazaki (Miyazaki)
 Ōita Prefecture
 ANA Intercontinental Beppu Resort & Spa (Beppu)
Okinawa
ANA Intercontinental Manza Beach Resort (Onna) 
ANA Intercontinental Ishigaki Resort (Ishigaki)

Overseas
 South Korea
 Intercontinental Grand Seoul Parnas (Seoul)
 Intercontinental COEX Seoul (Seoul)

Previous hotel properties
 ANA Crowne Plaza Hotel Wakkanai, Wakkanai, Hokkaidō (now Surfeel Hotel Wakkanai)
 Hakodate Harbor Hotel, Hakodate, Hokkaidō (now Four Points by Sheraton Hakodate)
 Hotel Castle, Yamagata, Yamagata Prefecture
 Bandai Sliver Hotel, Niigata, Niigata Prefecture
 ANA Tower Gate Hotel Osaka, Izumisano, Osaka Prefecture (now Star Gate Hotel Kansai Airport)
 ANA Hotel Clement Takamatsu, Takamatsu, Kagawa Prefecture (now JR Hotel Clement Takamatsu)
 Huis Ten Bosch ANA JR Hotel, Sasebo, Nagasaki Prefecture (now Hotel Okura JR Huis Ten Bosch)
 Oita ANA Hotel Oasis Tower, Ōita, Ōita Prefecture (now Hotel Nikko Oita Oasis Tower)
 ANA Crowne Plaza Hotel Okinawa Harbor View, Naha, Okinawa Prefecture (now Hotel Okinawa Harbor View)   
 Laguna Garden Hotel, Ginowan, Okinawa Prefecture
 ANA Harbour Grand Hotel Sydney, Sydney (now Shangri-La Hotel Sydney)

See also 

InterContinental Hotels Group

References

External links

  
  

1973 establishments in Japan
Hotels established in 1973
Hospitality companies of Japan
Japanese brands
All Nippon Airways
InterContinental Hotels Group
InterContinental Hotels Group brands
Service companies based in Tokyo